John William MacDonald (October 8, 1900 – May 13, 1983) was a Canadian politician. He represented the electoral district of Pictou East in the Nova Scotia House of Assembly from 1949 to 1956, and 1960 to 1963. He was a member of the Nova Scotia Liberal Party.

Born in 1900 at Avondale, Pictou County, Nova Scotia, MacDonald was a lumber dealer by career. He married Jean Evans in 1930. He entered provincial politics in the 1949 election, winning the Pictou East riding. He was re-elected in the 1953 election. In the 1956 election, MacDonald was defeated by 5 votes, losing to Progressive Conservative William A. MacLeod. In the 1960 election, MacDonald regained the seat from MacLeod by 144 votes. He did not re-offer in the 1963 election. MacDonald died in New Glasgow on May 13, 1983.

References

1900 births
1983 deaths
Nova Scotia Liberal Party MLAs
People from Pictou County